Saint-Wandrille-Rançon is a former commune in the Seine-Maritime department in the Normandy region in north west France. On 1 January 2016, it was merged into the new commune of Rives-en-Seine.

Geography
Until 1960, the Pont de Brotonne was the first bridging point of the Seine. Today it carries the D490 over the river.

Heraldry

Places of interest
It is celebrated for the ruins of its Benedictine abbey, the Abbey of Saint Wandrille (formerly known as Fontenelle Abbey). The abbey church belongs to the 13th and 14th centuries; portions of the nave walls supported by flying buttresses are standing, and the windows and vaulting of the side aisles are in fair preservation. The church is joined to cloisters from which an interesting door of the Renaissance period opens into the refectory. Beside this entrance is a richly ornamented lavabo of the Renaissance period. The refectory is a room over 100 ft. long and lit by graceful windows of the same period. The abbey was founded in the 7th century by Saint Wandrille, aided by donations from Clovis II. It soon became renowned for learning and piety. In the 13th century it was burnt down, and rebuilding was not completed till the beginning of the 16th century. Later in the same century it was practically destroyed by the Huguenots, and again the restoration was not finished for more than a hundred years. The demolition of the church began at the time of the Revolution but stopped in 1832.

Population

See also
Communes of the Seine-Maritime department

References

External links

Website about the village of Saint-Wandrille-Rançon 
Website of the Abbey of Saint-Wandrille 

Former communes of Seine-Maritime